Coptops semiscalaris is a species of beetle in the family Cerambycidae. It was described by Maurice Pic in 1928.

References

semiscalaris
Beetles described in 1928